Nationality words link to articles with information on the nation's poetry or literature (for instance, Irish or France).

Events
 John Donne secretly weds Ann More, niece of Sir Thomas Egerton

Works

Great Britain
 Nicholas Breton, A Divine Poeme
 Robert Chester, Loues martyr: or, Rosalins complaint
 Henoch Clapham, Aelohim-triune
 Robert Jones:
 The First Booke of Songes or Ayres of Foure Parts
 The Second Booke of Songes and Ayres
 Gervase Markham, Marie Magdalens Lamentations for the Losse of her Master Jesus
 Thomas Morley:
 First Booke of Ayres
 The Triumphes of Oriana
 William Shakespeare, The Phoenix and the Turtle published in Robert Chester's Loves Martyr
 John Weever, The Mirror of Martyrs; or, The Life and Death of that Thrice Valiant Captaine, and Most Godly Martyre, Sir John Old-castle Knight Lord Cobham

Other
 Jean Bertaut, Recueil des oeuvres poetiques ("Collection of Poetic Works"), France

Births
 August 22 – Georges de Scudéry (died 1667), French novelist, dramatist and poet; elder brother of Madeleine de Scudéry
Also:
 John Earle born about this year (died 1665), English bishop, writer and poet
 Antonio Enríquez Gómez (died 1661), Spanish dramatist, poet and novelist
 Saib Tabrizi (died 1677), Persian, master of a form of classical Arabic and Persian lyric poetry known as ghazel

Deaths
 April 10 – Mark Alexander Boyd (born 1562), Scottish poet and soldier of fortune
 By May – Geoffrey Whitney (born 1548), English poet
 August 4 – Edward Grant (born 1548), English scholar, poet and headmaster of Westminster School
 About this year – Thomas Nashe (born 1567), English pamphleteer, poet and satirist

See also
 16th century in literature
 Dutch Renaissance and Golden Age literature
 Elizabethan literature
 English Madrigal School
 French Renaissance literature
 Renaissance literature
 Spanish Renaissance literature
 University Wits

Notes

17th-century poetry
Poetry